Law of the Valley is a 1944 American Western film directed by Howard Bretherton. This is the twelfth film in the "Marshal Nevada Jack McKenzie" series, and stars Johnny Mack Brown as Jack McKenzie and Raymond Hatton as his sidekick Sandy Hopkins, with Lynne Carver, Kirk Barron and Edmund Cobb.

Cast
Johnny Mack Brown as Marshal Nevada McKenzie 
Raymond Hatton as Marshal Sandy Hopkins 
Lynne Carver as Ann Jennings 
Kirk Barron as Tom Findley 
Edmund Cobb as Dan Stanton 
Charles King as Miller - Henchman 
Tom Quinn as Condon - Henchman 
Steve Clark as Slim Roberts - Henchman 
Hal Price as Sheriff 
Marshall Reed as Al Green - Henchman 
George DeNormand as Red Adams - Henchman 
George Morrell as Jennings - Rancher 
Charles McMurphy as Bartender

References

Bibliography
Martin, Len D. The Allied Artists Checklist: The Feature Films and Short Subjects of Allied Artists Pictures Corporation, 1947-1978. McFarland & Company, 1993.

External links

1944 films
1944 Western (genre) films
American Western (genre) films
Films directed by Howard Bretherton
Monogram Pictures films
American black-and-white films
1940s English-language films
1940s American films